Allister is an American pop punk band from Chicago, Illinois.

Allister may refer to:

 Allister (surname)
 Allister, West Virginia, US, an unincorporated community
 Allister, one of the Gym Leaders in Pokémon Sword and Shield

See also
 Alistair, which includes a list of people with the given name Allister